The 2007 Nigerian Senate election in Katsina State was held on April 21, 2007, to elect members of the Nigerian Senate to represent Katsina State. Ibrahim M. Ida representing Katsina Central, Mahmud Kanti Bello representing Katsina North and Garba Yakubu Lado representing Katsina South all won on the platform of the Peoples Democratic Party.

Overview

Summary

Results

Katsina Central 
The election was won by Ibrahim M. Ida of the Peoples Democratic Party.

Katsina North 
The election was won by Mahmud Kanti Bello of the Peoples Democratic Party.

Katsina South 
The election was won by Garba Yakubu Lado of the Peoples Democratic Party.

References 

April 2007 events in Nigeria
Katsina State Senate elections
Kats